Chaoyang District (postal: Chaoyang) is a district in the municipality of Shantou, Guangdong Province, China.

Administration
Population figures given as of the 2003 census.

Subdistricts (街道, jiedao)
 Wenguang - pop. 146649
 Mianbei - pop. 54942
 Chengnan - pop. 108651
 Jinpu - pop. 79252

Towns (镇, zhen)
 Haimen - pop. 115221
 Guanbu - pop. 121930
 Heping - pop. 162174
 Gurao - pop. 135628
 Guiyu - pop. 133727
 Tongyu - pop. 116044
 Jinyu - pop. 77977
 Zaopu - pop. 49406
 Xilu - pop. 154725
 Hexi - pop. 79155

Famous natives
Chin Sophonpanich, founder of Bangkok Bank
Cai Chusheng (1906–1968), film director
Huang Guangyu, Chinese billionaire
 Rocky Cheng Kin Lok (鄭健樂), maturity winner of the Mr. Hong Kong contest in 2005

Climate

References

External links

 Official site, in simplified Chinese

Shantou
County-level divisions of Guangdong